Ferenc Klics (20 January 1924 – 25 April 1993) was a Hungarian athlete who competed in the 1948 Summer Olympics, 1952 Summer Olympics, 1956 Summer Olympics, and in the 1960 Summer Olympics. He was born in Hercegfalva and died in Budapest.

References

1924 births
1993 deaths
Hungarian male discus throwers
Sportspeople from Fejér County
Olympic athletes of Hungary
Athletes (track and field) at the 1948 Summer Olympics
Athletes (track and field) at the 1952 Summer Olympics
Athletes (track and field) at the 1956 Summer Olympics
Athletes (track and field) at the 1960 Summer Olympics
20th-century Hungarian people